The 2006 Slammiversary was a professional wrestling pay-per-view (PPV) event produced by Total Nonstop Action Wrestling, which took place on June 18, 2006 from the Impact Zone in Orlando, Florida. It was the second event under the Slammiversary chronology and marked the fourth anniversary of the promotion. Seven professional wrestling matches were featured on the event's card.

In October 2017, with the launch of the Global Wrestling Network, the event became available to stream on demand.

Results

Six-man elimination match

King of the Mountain match statistics

References

External links
ImpactWrestling.com - the official website of Total Nonstop Action Wrestling
A recap of TNA Slammiversary 2006 at 411mania.com

Slammiversary
2006 in professional wrestling in Florida
Events in Orlando, Florida
Professional wrestling in Orlando, Florida
June 2006 events in the United States
2006 Total Nonstop Action Wrestling pay-per-view events